Incilius perplexus (common name: confusing toad) is a species of toad in the family Bufonidae. It is endemic to southern Mexico and found in the Tepalcatepec River basin in the Michoacán state and western Balsas River basin in Guerrero.
Its natural habitats are seasonal tropical forests near streams. It breeds in pools. It is threatened by habitat loss caused by infrastructure development and agricultural expansion.

References

perplexus
Amphibians described in 1943
Endemic amphibians of Mexico
Balsas dry forests
Taxonomy articles created by Polbot